Bon Savants is an American indie rock band formed in Boston, Massachusetts, United States

Consisting of lead singer and guitarist Thom Moran, guitarist Kevin Haley, bassist David Wessel, and drummer Andrew Dole, they have been nominated for two awards in the Boston Music Awards (Best Pop Act and Best Local Male Vocalist).

Although their debut EP Post Rock Defends the Nation suggests a post-rock sound, the band has been classified as shoegaze with a soothing, sweet, literate sound.

History 
Bon Savants began with Kevin Haley and Thom Moran in the mid-1990s while living in Frankfurt, Germany. Upon returning to the United States in 1997, they began to record songs about their experiences in post-Cold War Germany. In 2003, bassist David Wessel joined the band, and they named themselves the Bon Savants (good scientists in French). While playing small live shows in and around Boston (Moran was and still is a part-time rocket scientist at MIT), they rotated drummers until finally adding the drummer Andrew Dole as a permanent member.  

They released their first album Post Rock Defends the Nation without a label in 2006.  The album was mixed by Bill Racine (who worked with Rogue Wave, Phantom Planet, and The Flaming Lips).

Members 
 Thom Moran (guitar, vocals)
 Kevin Haley (guitar, vocals)
 David Wessel (bass)
 Andrew Dole (drums)
 Kevin Russi (explosions)
 Haley Pearson (BMD)

Discography

Albums 
 Post Rock Defends the Nation (2006)

References

External links
Official site
Bon Savants' MySpace

Indie rock musical groups from Massachusetts
Musical groups from Boston
Musical groups established in 1997
American shoegaze musical groups